The Gran Premio Nacional is a Group I flat race for three-year-olds, run over a distance of 2500 metres every November in Maroñas racetrack in Montevideo, Uruguay. It is the third leg of the Uruguayan Triple Crown for three year-olds.

Bibliography
 Results

Horse races in Uruguay
Flat horse races for three-year-olds